Reinhard Brandt (born 10 April 1937 in Klein Gladebrügge) is a German philosopher.

Brandt studied Greek, Latin and philosophy in Marburg, Munich and Paris. In 1965 he completed his doctorate on the Aristotelian theory of judgement. His habilitation was on an unpublished work of David Hume's theoretical philosophy.

From 1972, Brandt was a professor of history of philosophy at the University of Marburg. He retired in 2003. He also taught at several other universities.

His research focus is the philosophy of Immanuel Kant. He has recently published several articles on Kant in Italian.

External links
 Brandt's webpage at the University of Marburg (in German)

German philosophers
1937 births
Living people
German male writers
Members of the Göttingen Academy of Sciences and Humanities

21st-century German philosophers